Enrico Bondi (born 5 October 1934 in Arezzo) is an Italian administrator.

Although he graduated in Chemistry, Bondi has extensive experience of re-structuring companies in financial ill-health. Most notably, he took charge of Parmalat and its subsidiaries during the crisis that followed the Crac Parmalat in the early 2000s. This was a period which gave rise to a debt of €14bn. Bondi is currently the CEO of Parmalat.

On 11 October 2006, Bondi became chairman of Parma F.C., a position he held until the club's sale to Tommaso Ghirardi in January 2007.

He was nominated government commissioner for the spending review by the Monti Cabinet on 30 April 2012.

References

Living people
1934 births
People from Arezzo
Parma Calcio 1913 chairmen and investors
Italian football chairmen and investors